Constanța may refer to:

Constanța, a city in Romania
Constanța Burcică
Constanța Hodoș
Constanța Marino-Moscu

See also
Constantia (disambiguation)

Romanian feminine given names